Jim Lucas is an American politician and businessman serving as a member of the Indiana House of Representatives from the 69th district. He assumed office on November 7, 2012.

Early life and education 
Lucas was born and raised in Seymour, Indiana. He graduated from Seymour High School.

Career 
Lucas served in the United States Marine Corps. Outside of politics, he operates TAG Graphics, a graphic design company, and the Awning Guy, a construction company. He was elected to the Indiana House of Representatives in November 2012. From 2015 to 2017, he served as vice chair of the House Government and Regulatory Reform Committee. During the 2019–2020 legislative session, he served as vice chair of the House Select Committee on Government Reduction.

Controversies 
Lucas has been the subject of numerous controversies over comments made on his social media accounts, causing some to call for his resignation, as well as the removal of his position on several committees.

Comments on rape and domestic violence 
In June 2017, Lucas was caught in controversy for comments he made regarding rape victims, including claims that women who carried weapons had learned "how to not be victims," leading to accusations of victim blaming. Earlier that year, he had been the subject of controversy for a meme which was perceived to be mocking domestic violence victims.

Facebook posts about race and slavery 
In August 2019, Lucas was caught in controversy after posting a photo of a noose under a photo of a black man convicted of rape. Later, in May of 2020, Lucas was once again caught in controversy for posting a meme that was perceived to contain racist stereotypes of black children, leading to his removal from several study committees by House Speaker Todd Huston. In March 2021, Lucas received criticism for comments made about slavery in a Facebook live video.

Uvalde shooting 
In June 2022, Lucas faced widespread backlash over a post on Facebook which suggested that the Robb Elementary School shooting was a false flag operation, with some comparing the comments Lucas made on the shooting to those made by conspiracy theorist Alex Jones.

Quoting Joseph Goebbels 
In August 2022, Lucas received more backlash after posting a quote attributed to Nazi propagandist Joseph Goebbels on his Facebook account. Lucas would later follow up on the post and refused to apologize for the post.

Personal life 
Lucas and his wife, Lynn, have three children.

References 

Living people
People from Seymour, Indiana
Republican Party members of the Indiana House of Representatives
People from Jackson County, Indiana
Year of birth missing (living people)
American conspiracy theorists
Far-right politicians in the United States